Acrodon subulatus, the Overberg tiptoothfig, is a species of mesemb from South Africa.

Description 
Acrodon subulatus is a compact perennial succulent. It lacks adventitious roots and has only a tap root. The internodes are not visible. The dark green leaves have a broad base and a pointed tip. The keel and margin may or may not have teeth, although the broad-based and flexible teeth are present more often than not.

Flowers are present between November and April. They are white or pale pink with purple margins and a purple central line. The stamens and filamentous staminodes form a dense central cone. The bracts reach less than halfway up the stem bearing a single flower. The fruits are borne on long, erect stalks. The closing body is lens-shaped and splits with pressure.

This species shares the traditional compact Acrodon growth form with Acrodon bellidiflorus and Acrodon caespitosus. It is the smallest and most compact of the three species and has the slenderest leaves.

Distribution and habitat 
This species is endemic to the Western Cape of South Africa, where it grows between Caledon and Stanford. It grows in Fynbos and Renosterveld areas on gravelly open patches that are shaded at times. This is a winter rainfall area.

Etymology 
The species name (subulatus) refers to the way that the leaves taper from a broad base to a pointed tip.

Conservation 
Acrodon subulatus is considered to be endangered by the South African National Biodiversity Institue. When the species was assessed in 2006, it was found that there were fewer than 270 mature individuals across five small (20-100 mature individuals) subpopulations. The species has an extent of occurrence of under  and over 80 percent of this land has already been lost due to agriculture. The species is also threatened by spreading invasive species, such as shrubs and grasses.

References 

Plants described in 1928
Flora of South Africa
subulatus